Steinweg is a German surname that may refer to
Henry E. Steinway (born Steinweg; 1797–1871), German-American piano maker
Grotrian-Steinweg, a German manufacturer of luxury pianos
C.F. Theodore Steinway (born Steinweg; 1825–1889, in Brunswick), German-American piano maker, son of Henry 
Klara Steinweg (1903–1972), German art historian, specializing in the Italian Renaissance. 
Marcus Steinweg (born 1971), German philosopher
Stefan Steinweg (born 1969), German racing cyclist
William Steinway (born Steinweg; 1835–1896), German-American  businessman and civic leader, son of Henry

German-language surnames